Karimabad is a town in Upper Chitral District, Khyber Pakhtunkhwa province of Pakistan. The district of Chitral is divided into three tehsils and 24 Union Councils.

References

This area has a Nuristani Kata Trible home place - a popular Kata Stone (Kata Boht) is also link to the same tribe. The popular stone situated in Juwara a Summer Place of Kata Tribe. The tribe belongs to the Jana Branch of Kata.

Chitral District
Tehsils of Chitral District
Union councils of Khyber Pakhtunkhwa
Populated places in Chitral District
Union councils of Chitral District
Ismailism in Pakistan